Armillaria procera is a species of agaric fungus in the family Physalacriaceae. This species is found in South America.

See also 
 List of Armillaria species

References 

procera
Fungi described in 1889
Fungi of South America
Fungal tree pathogens and diseases
Taxa named by Carlo Luigi Spegazzini